Mula bagh(مولاباغ) is a beautiful place in Torawari of Hangu District in Khyber Pakhtunkhwa, Pakistan.
It was a garden in ancient times, and again in 1980 to 1991. Later people started cutting trees and although it still a beautiful place, it has less trees. There is cricket ground in which the people of Mula Bagh play cricket including cricket tournaments.  The Mula Bagh known as the cricket center of Torawari.

People around Mula Bagh
People near Mula Bagh are known as a  peaceful and loyal peoples.  They support each other in any difficult way. People in neighboring areas come to Mulabagh for leisure as it has many sitting places for having fun or sightseeing such as the torawari mountains.  The mountains are near the Mula Bagh flowing stream which is popular for bathing.

Populated places in Hangu District, Pakistan